Anne Elizabeth is an American romance novel writer. She also writes graphic novels and comics. Elizabeth is a member of the Authors Guild and Romance Writers of America.

Biography 
Anne Elizabeth is from Greenwich, Connecticut. She attended Greenwich Academy and later graduated from Boston University. Her comics and graphic novel series, Pulse of Power, is based in Greenwich, Connecticut, and New York City. She is married to a member of SEAL Team ONE and they are active in the Navy SEAL Community. She lives in the mountains above San Diego, California, with her husband.

Awards 
Elizabeth was the second annual winner of the L.A. Banks Warrior Woman Award at the Romantic Times Booklovers Convention. In 2017, she was awarded the RWA Service award at the Romance Writers of America convention.

Writing
Elizabeth writes in three genres: romance, military romance and comics. Her first romance stories were published in anthologies: Zane's Flava series beginning in 2006, Highland Press's military romance series (2007 - 2009): Operation L.O.V.E., Holiday Op, and For Your Heart Only. Her military romance novels primarily focus on U.S. Navy SEALs and Spec Ops Groups. Her first U.S. Navy SEAL based romance novel, A SEAL at Heart, was published by Sourcebooks, Inc. in 2012.  The collection, Hot Alpha Seals, with her story "The Kiss of a Seal", reached number 44 on the USA Today book bestseller list and number 23 on the New York Times list. She writes the stories for graphic novels and comics.

Columnist and Interviewer 
From 2008 through 2014, Elizabeth was the columnist on comics, manga and graphic novels for Romantic Times, RT Book Reviews. She performed interviews with published writers and graphic artists. She also wrote comic industry news updates and feature columns. Elizabeth is also a frequent presenter at Romance Writers of America conventions as well as Romantic Times.

Books

West Coast Navy SEALs

 A SEAL at Heart (2012, Sourcebooks, Inc.)
 Once a SEAL (2013, Sourcebooks, Inc.)
 A SEAL Forever (2014, Sourcebooks, Inc.)
 The Kiss of a SEAL (2015, Bravo Zulu, ASIN B00PKL1ITG)
 The Soul of a SEAL (2016, Sourcebooks Casablanca)

Short stories

Navy SEAL stories In anthologies

 Operation: L.O.V.E., "Funny Bone" (2009, Highland Press)
 Hot Alpha SEALS Military Romance Megaset, "The Kiss of a SEAL" (2014, Hot Alpha Authors)
 "The Way of the Warrior" (2015, Sourcebooks, Inc.)

Other stories

 Zane's Caramel Flava, "Sugar & Butter Poured Over Muscle" (2006, Atria/Simon & Schuster)
 Recipe For Love, "A Heart's Hunger" (2007, Highland Press)
 Zane's Honey Flava, "Dragon's Breath" (2008, Atria/Simon & Schuster)
 Holiday Op, "Tied With A Bow", (2009, Highland Press) 
 For Your Heart Only, "Good Vibrations" (2010, Highland Press)

Graphic Novels
 Pulse of Power, Dynamite, 2010 (with Brett Booth (Cover Design) and Marcio Fiorito (Artist) ) 
 The Pendulum, Sea Lion Books,  2011 (with Alisa Kwitney (Editor), Siya Oum (Illustrator) ) 
 The Power Play, A Story From The Pulse of Power World, Bravo Zulu Studios, 2012

Comics

Hall of Insides 
 Hall of Insides, Volume 1 (2011, Bravo Zulu Studios)
 The Wizard vs. the Hairy Willets, Volume 2 (2014, Bravo Zulu Studios)
 Bully Boys, Volume 3 (2014, Bravo Zulu Studios)
 The Zentopedes, Volume 4 (2014, Bravo Zulu Studios)
 Truth Man, Volume 5 (2014, Bravo Zulu Studios)
 The Hall of Insides Collection, Truth and Consequences (2015, Bravo Zulu Studios)

Zombie Power 
 Zombie Power, Volume 1 (2012, Bravo Zulu Studios)
 Volume 2 (2014, Bravo Zulu Studios)
 Willie's Journal, Volume 3 (2014, Bravo Zulu Studios)

References

External links
 

American romantic fiction writers
Women romantic fiction writers
American women novelists
Year of birth missing (living people)
Living people